Dawsonia longiseta is a species of moss found in Australia. The smallest of the three Australian Dawsonia species, with a stem up to 5 cm long.

References

Polytrichaceae
Flora of New South Wales
Flora of Queensland
Flora of Tasmania
Flora of Victoria (Australia)